The 2013 New Zealand V8 season was the fourteenth season of the series, under the NZV8 guise. The season began at Teretonga Park on 11 January and finished at the Pukekohe Park Raceway ITM Auckland 400 V8 Supercars event on 14 April after five championship meetings. The TLX Championship was won by Jason Bargwanna and the TL Championship was won by AJ Lauder.

Teams and drivers

Calendar

Championship standings

TLX Championship

TL Championship

References

External links
 The official website of NZV8

V8
NZ Touring Cars Championship seasons